The Women's K-2 500 metres event at the 2015 Southeast Asian Games took place on 8 June 2015 at Marina Channel.

There will be 6 teams set to take part in this event.

Schedule
All times are Singapore Standard Time (UTC+08:00)

Start list

Results 
{| class="wikitable sortable" style="text-align:center"
|-
! Rank !! Lane !! Nation !! Athletes !! Time
|}

References

External links
SEA Games 2015 - Canoeing Sport Schedule

Canoeing at the 2015 Southeast Asian Games
Women's sports competitions in Singapore
2015 in women's canoeing